Charles Collins (January 24, 1946 – February 23, 2012) was a Canadian football player who played for the Saskatchewan Roughriders and Montreal Alouettes. He won the Grey Cup with Montreal in 1970. He previously played college football at Auburn University in Alabama. In 2012, he died in a car accident at the age of 66.

References

1946 births
2012 deaths
Montreal Alouettes players
Saskatchewan Roughriders players
Auburn Tigers football players
American football running backs
Canadian football running backs
American players of Canadian football
Players of American football from Marietta, Georgia
Road incident deaths in Georgia (U.S. state)